Ezola Broussard Foster (August 9, 1938 – May 22, 2018) was an American conservative political activist, writer, and politician. She was president of the interest group Black Americans for Family Values, author of the book What's Right for All Americans, and the Reform Party candidate for vice president in the 2000 U.S. presidential election with presidential nominee Pat Buchanan. In April 2002, Foster left the Reform Party for the Constitution Party.

Early life and career 
Foster was born and reared in Maurice in Vermilion Parish in southwestern Louisiana, in 1938. In 1960, she graduated with a BA in Business Education from Texas Southern University. She would go on to earn, in 1973, a Master's in School Management and Administration from Pepperdine University. In 1960, she moved to Los Angeles, California, where she was employed as a public high school teacher for thirty-three years—teaching typing, business courses, and sometimes English classes.

Political career

Early activism 
Foster first ran for office in 1986, securing the Republican nomination for the California Assembly's 48th district. In the general election, she faced incumbent assemblywoman Maxine Waters; a third candidate, Libertarian José "Joe" Castañeda, was also in the race. In the three-person race, Foster placed second, securing 12.77 percent of the vote but losing to Waters by 72 percentage points. In 1992, she was a staunch defender of the police officers in the Rodney King beating case and organized a testimonial dinner for Laurence Powell, one of the convicted officers, in 1995.

In 1994, while teaching at Bell High School in Bell, California, Foster was a public advocate of Proposition 187, a California ballot initiative to deny government programs of social services, health care, and public education to illegal immigrants. Her position was extremely unpopular at the school where she taught, which was 90 percent Hispanic. In 1996, she appeared on PBS's MacNeil/Lehrer NewsHour to promote her new political book, What's Right for All Americans. During her appearance, she argued that illegal immigration was responsible for the low quality of Los Angeles schools, some of her colleagues at the school condemned her in an open letter. Two days later, she attended an anti-illegal-immigration rally where several of her supporters were attacked by members of the Progressive Labor Party, who allegedly wanted to harm Foster herself. Shortly thereafter, she left her job, which she calls a necessity resulting from her treatment at work. She went on speaking tours for the John Birch Society and took workers' compensation for an undisclosed mental disorder—which she describes as "stress" and "anxiety"—until her official retirement as a teacher in 1998.

Foster has appeared on Larry King Live, CBS This Morning, CNN & CO., Nightline, NewsTalk Television, CNN Live, MSNBC, Politically Incorrect, and various CBS, NBC, and ABC newscasts.

2000 election 

Pat Buchanan, noting Foster's conservative media credentials and public speaking ability, asked her to be his running mate after Jim Traficant of Ohio, Teamsters Union president James P. Hoffa, and others declined his request. His critics claimed Foster, who had never held political office, was chosen because she was African American; they likened it to affirmative action, a diversity-increasing policy that Buchanan had always opposed.

Foster, who supported Buchanan's campaigns in 1992 and 1996, quit her speaking tour to join the race. While Buchanan was hospitalized during part of the campaign, Foster was the face of the campaign, making television and radio appearances. She is the first African American and second woman (after Geraldine Ferraro) to be nominated for vice president by a party that was recognized and funded by the Federal Election Commission. During the campaign, Foster was the source of some controversy, drawing criticism for her membership with the John Birch Society and for her alleged mental illness which kept her from teaching.

Congressional run 
Foster ran for Congress in the June 5, 2001, special election in California's 32nd district to replace deceased representative Julian Dixon as the Reform Party candidate and garnered 1.5% of the vote.

Personal life 
Foster was Catholic. Her first marriage ended in annulment, she said, when she found out that her husband was a convicted felon. Later, in 1977, she married Chuck Foster, a truck driver.

Electoral history

Published works

See also

 Black conservatism in the United States

References

Further reading
 Issues2000.org – Some of Foster's campaign positions and quotations
 Foster, Ezola (August 31, 1995). "Let the Children be Children". National Minority Politics

External links
 
 

1938 births
20th-century American politicians
20th-century American non-fiction writers
20th-century Roman Catholics
21st-century Roman Catholics
African-American Catholics
African-American people in California politics
African-American candidates for Vice President of the United States
African-American women in politics
Black conservatism in the United States
American political writers
California Democrats
California Republicans
California Constitutionalists
Female candidates for Vice President of the United States
John Birch Society members
Activists from Houston
Activists from Los Angeles
People from Maurice, Louisiana
Reform Party of the United States of America vice presidential nominees
2000 United States vice-presidential candidates
20th-century American women politicians
American women non-fiction writers
Right-wing populism in the United States
Catholics from Texas
Catholics from California
Catholics from Louisiana
20th-century American women writers
2018 deaths
21st-century American women
20th-century African-American women writers
20th-century African-American writers
21st-century African-American women
21st-century African-American people
Roman Catholic activists